Ernest Gold CB DSO OBE FRS (24 July 1881 – 30 January 1976) was a British meteorologist.

He was born at Berkswell, near Coventry and educated at Mason University College (which later became the University of Birmingham) and St John's College, Cambridge.

Gold set up the first operational (military) meteorological service and demonstrated the vital role of meteorologists to the military hierarchy. He was mentioned in dispatches and was awarded the DSO and OBE and rose to the rank of Lieutenant-Colonel.
Gold oversaw not only the creation of an operational weather service but also the development of international aviation services, becoming President of the Commission for Synoptic Weather Information of the International Meteorological Organization (now the World Meteorological Organization).

In 1919 he became Deputy Director of the Meteorological Office.

He was President of the Royal Meteorological Society for 1934–35.

Honours and awards
1918 Elected Fellow of the Royal Society
1918 OBE 
1926 Symons Gold Medal
1942 CB
1958 International Meteorological Organization Prize of the World Meteorological Organization.

References

External links  
 Writing by Ernest Gold at archive.org: 

 E. Gold: The Isothermal Layer of the Atmosphere and Atmospheric Radiation (February 16, 1909)
 The Relation between Wind Velocity at 1000 Metres Altitude and the Surface Pressure Distribution (1908)
 The Velocity of the Negative Ions in Flames (1907)

1881 births
1976 deaths
People from Coventry
Companions of the Distinguished Service Order
Companions of the Order of the Bath
Fellows of the Royal Society
Officers of the Order of the British Empire
Presidents of the Royal Meteorological Society
Alumni of St John's College, Cambridge
Alumni of the University of Birmingham
English meteorologists